The arrondissement of Nanterre is an arrondissement of France in the Hauts-de-Seine department in the Île-de-France region. It has 17 communes.

Composition 

The communes of the arrondissement of Nanterre, and their INSEE codes, are:

 Asnières-sur-Seine (92004)
 Bois-Colombes (92009)
 Clichy (92024)
 Colombes (92025)
 Courbevoie (92026)
 Garches (92033)
 La Garenne-Colombes (92035)
 Gennevilliers (92036)
 Levallois-Perret (92044)
 Nanterre (92050)
 Neuilly-sur-Seine (92051)
 Puteaux (92062)
 Rueil-Malmaison (92063)
 Saint-Cloud (92064)
 Suresnes (92073)
 Vaucresson (92076)
 Villeneuve-la-Garenne (92078)

History

The arrondissement of Nanterre was created in 1964 as part of the department Seine. In 1968 it became part of the new department Hauts-de-Seine. At the January 2017 reorganisation of the arrondissements of Hauts-de-Seine, it received two communes from the arrondissement of Boulogne-Billancourt.

As a result of the reorganisation of the cantons of France which came into effect in 2015, the borders of the cantons are no longer related to the borders of the arrondissements. The cantons of the arrondissement of Nanterre were, as of January 2015:

 Asnières-sur-Seine-Nord
 Asnières-sur-Seine-Sud
 Bois-Colombes
 Clichy
 Colombes-Nord-Est
 Colombes-Nord-Ouest
 Colombes-Sud
 Courbevoie-Nord
 Courbevoie-Sud
 Garches
 La Garenne-Colombes
 Gennevilliers-Nord
 Gennevilliers-Sud
 Levallois-Perret-Nord
 Levallois-Perret-Sud
 Nanterre-Nord
 Nanterre-Sud-Est
 Nanterre-Sud-Ouest
 Neuilly-sur-Seine-Nord
 Neuilly-sur-Seine-Sud
 Puteaux
 Rueil-Malmaison
 Suresnes
 Villeneuve-la-Garenne

References

Nanterre